Bounthavy Sipasong (Lao: ບຸນທະວີ ສີປະສົງ; born 4 June 1996) is a Laotian professional footballer who plays as a central defensive midfielder for Master 7 FC in Lao League 1 season 2022.

External links 
 
 

1996 births
Living people
Laotian footballers
Laos international footballers
Association football defenders
Footballers at the 2014 Asian Games
Asian Games competitors for Laos